Elections were held in  Central Visayas for seats in the House of Representatives of the Philippines on May 10, 2010.

The candidate with the most votes won that district's seat for the 15th Congress of the Philippines.

Summary

Bohol

Each of Bohol's three legislative districts will elect each representative to the House of Representatives. The candidate with the highest number of votes wins the seat.

1st District
Edgar M. Chatto (Lakas-Kampi-CMD) is the incumbent, but he is ineligible for re-election since he is on his third consecutive term already. Former governor Rene Relampagos will run in his place; he is running under the Laban ng Demokratikong Pilipino although Lakas-Kampi-CMD is also supporting his candidacy.

2nd District
Roberto Cajes is the incumbent, but he is ineligible for re-election since he is on his third consecutive term already. Lakas-Kampi-CMD initially nominated  Erico B. Aumentado as their candidate in this district, but Aumentado was expelled from the party because of his alleged association with Manny Villar, the presidential nominee of the rival Nacionalista Party. Lakas-Kampi-CMD then sent a certificate of nomination to incumbent congressman Roberto Cajes' wife Judith.

3rd District
Adam Relson Jala (Lakas-Kampi-CMD) is the incumbent. But Jala decided not to run for a second term this election. He ran for provincial vice-governorship but later dropped his candidacy to support his uncle, Elpidio Jala, who is also running for vice governor. Secretary of Agriculture Arthur Yap is running instead unopposed, currently the only Cabinet official not facing opposition.

Cebu

Local party One Cebu is affiliated with Lakas-Kampi-CMD. The party designations are as designated by the official COMELEC list.

1st District
Incumbent Eduardo Gullas is also supported by Lakas-Kampi-CMD and its affiliate One Cebu.

2nd District
Pablo Garcia is the incumbent.

3rd District
Pablo John Garcia is the incumbent.

4th District
Celestino Martinez III is the pending incumbent after Benhur Salimbangon was unseated by the Supreme Court due to poll fraud. The case is under a motion for reconsideration. Martinez may not be seated until the last week of January as Congress will adjourn for election-campaigning. Martinez was able to take office on May 25, just over a month left into his term, after swearing in the plenary, after Salimbangon's proclamation as the winner of the 2010 election.

5th District
Incumbent Ramon Durano VI is also co-nominated by One Cebu and Lakas-Kampi-CMD

6th District
Lapu-Lapu City was given its own legislative district prior to the election.

Incumbent Nerissa Corazon Soon-Ruiz switched from the Lakas-Kampi-CMD to the Nacionalista Party on March 29, 2010. She is in her third consecutive term already and is ineligible for reelection. She will instead run for Mayor of Mandaue City. Lakas-Kampi-CMD and One Cebu nominated Gabriel Luis Quisumbing as their candidate in this district.

Cebu City

Local party Bando Osmeña – Pundok Kauswagan (BO-PK) is affiliated with the Liberal Party.

1st District
Incumbent Raul del Mar (Liberal) is in third consecutive term already and is ineligible for reelection. His daughter, Rachel is his party's nominee as well its affiliate Bando Osmeña – Pundok Kauswagan.

2nd District
Incumbent Antonio Cuenco is in third consecutive term already and is ineligible for reelection. He was appointed as Secretary-General of the ASEAN Inter-Parliamentary Assembly (AIPA) on February 4, 2010. Two of his three parties, Lakas-Kampi-CMD and the Probinsya Muna Development Initiative (PROMDI) did not nominate a candidate to run in this district. However, the Kugi Uswag Sugbo (Kusug) nominated businessman Jonathan Guardo as their candidate which is affiliated with the Nacionalista Party.

Cebu City mayor Tomas Osmeña, who is in his third consecutive as mayor and is ineligible for reelection as mayor, is running for Congress under the Liberal Party and its affiliate Bando Osmeña – Pundok Kauswagan.

Lapu-Lapu City

Lapu-Lapu City is going to elect their first congressman this election. They were formerly included in Cebu's 6th district.

Negros Oriental

1st District
Jocelyn Limkaichong is the incumbent.

2nd District
George Arnaiz is the incumbent.

3rd District
Pryde Henry Teves is the incumbent.

Siquijor

Orlando Fua, Sr. (Lakas-Kampi-CMD) is the incumbent.

References

External links
Official website of the Commission on Elections

2010 Philippine general election
2010